"Hollywood Nights" is a song written and recorded by American rock artist Bob Seger. It was released in 1978 as the second single from his album, Stranger in Town.

Background
Seger said "The chorus just came into my head; I was driving around in the Hollywood Hills, and I started singing 'Hollywood nights/Hollywood hills/Above all the lights/Hollywood nights.' I went back to my rented house, and there was a Time with Cheryl Tiegs on the cover...I said 'Let's write a song about a guy from the Midwest who runs into someone like this and gets caught up in the whole bizarro thing.'" 

Seger also said that "Hollywood Nights" was the closest he has had to a song coming to him in a dream, similar to how Keith Richards described the riff to "(I Can't Get No) Satisfaction" coming to him in a dream.  Seger said:

Personnel
Credits are adapted from the liner notes of Seger's 1994 Greatest Hits compilation.

The Silver Bullet Band
Bob Seger – lead vocals, guitar
Chris Campbell – bass
David Teegarden – drums, percussion

Additional musicians
Bill Payne – piano, organ
Julia Waters, Luther Waters, Maxine Waters, Oren Waters – background vocals

Reception
Billboard described "Hollywood Nights" as "a gut crunching rocker with all the stops pulled out" and described Seger's vocal performance as "absolutely demonic."  Cash Box called it "a solid rocker about a Hollywood romance" with "a commanding beat, piano fills, driving guitar work and excellent lead and backing vocals."  Cash Box also said that "Hollywood Nights" is "what Seger is all about."  Record World said that this song is a "perfect example" of how "Seger is a master of the story song with a strong rock beat" and that "the lyrics are compelling and the outfront piano and Seger's throaty vocals give them even more substance."  Classic Rock History critic Janey Roberts rated it as Seger's 13th best song.

Chart performance
The single edit of "Hollywood Nights" reached No. 12 on the US Billboard Hot 100 chart.  In the UK, the full five-minute version was released as a single on black and silver vinyl, and gave him his chart debut at No. 42.  A live version from the in-concert album Nine Tonight in 1981 was issued in the UK as a single and charted at No. 49, while a reissue of the original version in 1995 charted at No. 52.

Certifications

References

1978 singles
Bob Seger songs
Songs written by Bob Seger
Capitol Records singles
1978 songs
Songs about Los Angeles
Hollywood, Los Angeles in fiction
Song recordings produced by Bob Seger
Song recordings produced by Punch Andrews